Ayatollah Mohammad Mohammadi Gilani (31 August 1928 – 9 July 2014) was a member of the Assembly of Experts of the Islamic Republic of Iran. He was the chief justice of the supreme court of Iran, a position different from the head of the judiciary.

Gilani was a judge of Tehran's Islamic Revolutionary Court for 1980–85. Later, he was a member of the Guardian Council between 1986 and 1992.

Gilani is also known for having signed the death warrants of Baha'i leaders in the years following the 1979 Islamic Revolution.

References & notes

External links
Iran Assembly of Experts' election results announced
Experts Assembly election results for Tehran
Chronology of Events in Iran, August 2004

 

Shia Islamists
Iranian Islamists
Iranian ayatollahs
20th-century Iranian judges
1928 births
2014 deaths
Members of the Assembly of Experts
Chief justices of Iran
Society of Seminary Teachers of Qom members
Members of the Guardian Council